Matas Jucikas (born February 10, 1994) is Lithuanian professional basketball player for Gifu Swoops of the Japanese B.League.

Professional career 
On August 10, 2016, Jucikas signed a three-year deal with Neptūnas Klaipėda of the Lithuanian Basketball League. On November 12, 2016, he was lent to BC Šiauliai, but was recalled to the team on January 13, 2017.

On September 5, 2019, he has signed with Nevėžis Kėdainiai of the Lithuanian Basketball League.

On January 21, 2022, he has signed with BK Ogre of the Latvijas Basketbola līga (LBL).

On August 25, 2022, Jucikas signed with Gifu Swoops of the Japanese B.League.

Personal life 
His older brother Julius Jucikas is also a professional basketball player.

References 

1994 births
Living people
BK Jūrmala players
BC Nevėžis players
BC Neptūnas players
BC Šiauliai players
Centers (basketball)
Gifu Swoops players
Lithuanian men's basketball players
People from Šilutė